Mário Jorge Quintas Felgueiras (born 12 December 1986) is a Portuguese former professional footballer who played as a goalkeeper.

He started playing for Sporting, Portimonense and Braga, being successively loaned by the first and third clubs and only totalling one Primeira Liga appearance for them. From 2011 until 2015 he competed in Romania, mainly with CFR Cluj.

Felgueiras won 42 caps for Portugal at youth level.

Club career

Sporting and Portimonense
Born in Viana do Castelo, Felgueiras joined Sporting CP's youth system in 2002 at the age of 15, from local SC Vianense. In early 2003, following an injury to regular starter Nélson Pereira, he was called to the first team for training, but he only managed to be called up for a competitive game during his tenure, remaining an unused substitute against Gil Vicente F.C. on 29 August 2004.

In summer 2005, Felgueiras was loaned to S.C. Espinho in the third division for two years, being first choice in his second season. Subsequently, he was released by the Lisbon side, signing a two-year contract with Portimonense S.C. in the Segunda Liga. He kept consecutive clean sheets in his first two official matches with his new club.

Braga
For the 2008–09 campaign, Felgueiras returned to the Primeira Liga, joining S.C. Braga as a free agent on a 4+1 deal. He only appeared in one game in his first year, ten minutes of a 1–1 draw at league champions FC Porto in the last matchday.

In 2009–10, Felgueiras was loaned to another top flight club, Vitória de Setúbal. In July 2010 he returned to Braga, appearing in both legs of the 4–2 aggregate win against Celtic in the third qualifying round of the UEFA Champions League. However, he was soon deemed surplus to requirements and made way for another Brazilian (Felipe, the 17th in the squad), leaving for Rio Ave F.C. until the end of the season– his official debut came in the league opener, a 0–1 home loss against C.D. Nacional.

Romania
Felgueiras was loaned by Braga to Romanian club FC Brașov for the 2011–12 campaign. The following year, after cutting all ties with the former, he agreed to a four-year contract with CFR Cluj also in Liga I, making his debut in the competition with his new team on 5 August in 3–0 home victory over FC Vaslui.

On 19 September 2012, Felgueiras put on a Player of the match performance against former side Braga, in a 2–0 Champions League group stage away win, being subsequently selected for the Team of the Round. In the same competition, he was also in goal to help to a 1–0 defeat of Manchester United at Old Trafford, being subsequently linked to Premier League's Everton as a backup to Tim Howard and commenting: "Any player would be interested in playing in the Premier League. I am very happy to hear about Everton's interest, but I will only think about leaving at the end of the season"; he also claimed that Portugal manager Paulo Bento "has been paying attention" to his performance, and that Sporting and S.L. Benfica had reportedly shown interest in acquiring his services.

Felgueiras received the first red card of his Romanian career (second overall) on 27 July 2013, in a 2–2 home draw against ACS Poli Timișoara. In November, as Cluj was facing a financial crisis, he and other players boycotted a league match; in total, he appeared in 100 games for the club in all competitions.

Konyaspor
On 2 February 2015, Felgueiras signed for Turkey's Konyaspor for three and a half years and €800.000. He made his debut ten days later, in a cup match against Galatasaray SK which ended with a 4–1 away loss.

Later years
Felgueiras returned to Portugal on 1 February 2016, joining F.C. Paços de Ferreira until 30 June 2017. He made 20 appearances in 2017–18, in a top-flight relegation.

After an unassuming spell in the Cypriot First Division with Anorthosis Famagusta FC, Felgueiras returned to his homeland and signed with his former club Espinho at the end of August 2019. However, two weeks later, the 32-year-old announced that he was retiring from football for personal reasons.

International career
On 8 February 2005, still a junior, Felgueiras made his first and only appearance for the Portugal under-21 team, playing 13 minutes in a 2–0 friendly win over the Republic of Ireland.

Club statistics

References

External links

1986 births
Living people
People from Viana do Castelo
Portuguese footballers
Association football goalkeepers
Primeira Liga players
Liga Portugal 2 players
Segunda Divisão players
SC Vianense players
Sporting CP footballers
S.C. Espinho players
Portimonense S.C. players
S.C. Braga players
Vitória F.C. players
Rio Ave F.C. players
F.C. Paços de Ferreira players
Liga I players
FC Brașov (1936) players
CFR Cluj players
Konyaspor footballers
Anorthosis Famagusta F.C. players
Portugal youth international footballers
Portugal under-21 international footballers
Portuguese expatriate footballers
Expatriate footballers in Romania
Expatriate footballers in Turkey
Expatriate footballers in Cyprus
Portuguese expatriate sportspeople in Romania
Portuguese expatriate sportspeople in Turkey
Portuguese expatriate sportspeople in Cyprus
Sportspeople from Viana do Castelo District